Robert Viser (fl.1571), was an English haberdasher and Member of Parliament.

He was a Member (MP) of the Parliament of England for Chippenham in 1571.

References

Year of birth missing
Year of death missing
16th-century English people
People of the Tudor period
Members of the Parliament of England (pre-1707)